William Spetz (born 4 April 1996 in Umeå) is a Swedish comedian and television personality. He became known after posting comedic videos on YouTube, he then got to do the two comedic kids shows Williams lista and Scener ur ett tonårsliv which was aired on SVT Play.

Spetz started blogging at the age of 12 at the blog portal Blogspot, but because of lack of interest he asked the paper Västerbottens-Kuriren if he could start a youth blog at their blog portal. In May 2010, Spetz started to do videoblogs at the YouTube channel "Lilla bloggen". In 2014, Spetz was a travelling reporter for Musikhjälpen and travelled to Mozambique. Spetz has also been a panellist at Intresseklubben on SVT. In November 2015, it was announced by SVT, that Spetz was one of the co-hosts alongside Gina Dirawi for the final of Melodifestivalen 2016.

Filmography
2019 - ''Quicksand (Netflix Series)
2020 - ‘Dag för Dag’ plays the role of Simon

References

External links 

Living people
1996 births
People from Umeå
Swedish comedians
Swedish bloggers
Swedish male actors
Video bloggers
Comedy YouTubers
Swedish YouTubers
YouTube channels launched in 2010
Swedish people of Pakistani descent